Philip Davey may refer to:

 Phillip Davey (1896–1953), Australian recipient of the Victoria Cross
 Philip Davey (cricketer) (1913–2000), English cricketer